Shaun Williams may refer to:

Shaun Williams (American football) (born 1976), safety
Shaun Williams (cricket coach) (born 1970), Australian coach of Bangladesh
Shaun Williams (DJ), British DJ and jazz dancer
Shaun Williams (footballer) (born 1986), Irish footballer
Shaun Williams (rugby union), South African rugby union player
Shaun Williams (wrestler) (born 1976), South African freestyle wrestler

See also
Sean Williams (disambiguation)